Imhoffiella is a phototrophic genus of bacteria from the family of Chromatiaceae. Imhoffiella is named after the German microbiologist Johannes F. Imhoff.

References

Chromatiales
Bacteria genera
Taxa described in 2017